Robert Kerr Hall was an officer in the United States North Dakota Army National Guard. He commanded troops during the strategically important Guadalcanal campaign and contributed significantly to the U.S. victory in the Battle for Henderson Field.

Pre-World War II
During the 1930s, as a captain in the part-time National Guard, he was known for his serious attitude towards training. "Hall's experience in WWI impressed the men, as did his serious demeanor and taciturn nature."

Guadalcanal
As a lieutenant colonel, he commanded 3rd Battalion, 164th Infantry during the Battle for Henderson Field in the Guadalcanal Campaign. His regiment, part of the U.S. Army's Americal Division, had only just arrived on Guadalcanal as an emergency reinforcement. In the middle of a dark and rainy night on 24 October 1942, under close combat conditions, he and Lt. Col. Chesty Puller, commander of 1st Battalion, 7th Marines, made the decision to place Hall's men among the understrength Marines rather take their own place on the 7500-ft. line.

Puller and Hall personally placed the soldiers with Marines in existing positions. The soldiers, armed with the new M-1 rifles, added considerable firepower to the Marines, who were armed with the older M1903 Springfield rifles. "With daylight, Puller and Hall reordered the lines, putting (Hall's) 3rd Battalion, 164th into its own positions to Puller's left." Hall's troops were crucial in helping repulse numerous attacks by troops from the Imperial Japanese Army's 2nd Infantry Division.  The Japanese defeat in the battle was the last serious attempt by Japanese army troops to retake Henderson Field, an important strategic victory for the United States and its allies.  Acting on the recommendation of Puller, First Marine Division commander A. A. Vandegrift awarded Colonel Hall the Navy Cross for his role in the battle.

Hall was wounded on Guadalcanal in November 1942, but recovered to lead his battalion in the final battles for control of the island.  He subsequently returned to the states and trained troops in jungle combat.  He retired from the army at the end of the war.

Awards & Decorations

Legacy
The command relationship between Hall and Puller and their merged battalion is still studied in military schools. After the battle, the 164th Infantry was informally called "The 164th Marines," and members were welcomed at Marine reunions for many years.

References
 The Story of the U.S. Marine Corps, J. Robert Moskin, Paddington Press, 1979
 The Battle for Guadalcanal, Samuel B. Griffith II, Lippincott, 1963
 Marines in World War II Commemorative Series, First Offensive, The Marine Campaign for Guadalcanal, Henry L. Shaw Jr., via Google
 Citizens as Soldiers: A History of the North Dakota National Guard, Jerry Cooper with Glenn Smith, via Google
 They Were Ready: The 164th Infantry in the Pacific War, 1942–1945,  Terry L. Shoptaugh, 164th Infantry Association, 2010.

United States Marine Corps personnel of World War II
People from Fargo, North Dakota
20th-century deaths
United States Marine Corps officers
Recipients of the Navy Cross (United States)
1895 births